The Society for Medieval Archaeology was founded in 1957. Its purpose was to publish a journal on medieval archaeology and organise conferences and events around the subject. It was the third archaeological society founded with a focus on a particular period, after the Prehistoric Society of East Anglia (1908) and the Society for the Promotion of Roman Studies (1911).

The society's journal is Medieval Archaeology.

The society's logo is a representation of the Anglo-Saxon Alfred Jewel. It was drawn by Eva Sjoegren (wife of David M. Wilson, one of the founders), appeared prominently on the front cover of the journal from 1957 to 2010, and continues to appear on the title page.

References

External links 

 

Organizations established in 1957
1957 establishments in the United Kingdom
Learned societies of the United Kingdom
Archaeological organizations